St. Augustine's Higher Secondary School, Karimkunnam  in Idukki district, Kerala is a co-educational institution established in 1938 which is run by the Knanaya Catholic Archdiocese of Kottayam. The school is operated by the corporate educational agency of the archdiocese.

St. Augustine's became a higher secondary school in 1998. The school has 500 students with a staff establishment of 27, and its current local manager is Fr. Sabu Malithuruthel.

Notable alumni

References

External links 
 

Catholic secondary schools in India
Archdiocese of Kottayam
High schools and secondary schools in Kerala
Christian schools in Kerala
Schools in Idukki district
Educational institutions established in 1938
1938 establishments in India